St Dyfnan's Church is a medieval church in the village of Llanddyfnan, Anglesey, Wales. The building dates from the 14th century and underwent extensive renovations in the mid-19th century. The church lies north from the B5109 road. It was designated as a Grade II*-listed building on 5 December 2007.

References

External links

14th-century church buildings in Wales
Grade II* listed churches in Anglesey